Gérson Rodrigues Andreotti known as Gérson Andreotti (born 19 October 1953), is a Brazilian professional football coach and former defensive midfielder. is one of the best known former players and current head-coaches/managers in Brazil, having as footballer, acted in clubs as Fluminense FC, Atlético Paranaense, Olaria and América (SP). 
Then exercised the function of coach, initially at Lousano Paulista an assistant-tech Zagallo and Evaristo de Macedo in Flamengo. but after hanging around various clubs in Brazil, but it was in Friburguense, where he won more emphasis for having brought the team almost the Campeonato Brasileiro Série C and the league Copa Rio. had a passage by Macaé, but returned to the club of Nova Friburgo.

Honours

Player
 Juventus
 Campeonato Brasileiro Série B: 1983

 Ríver
 Campeonato Piauiense: 1973

Manager 
 Brasiliense
 Campeonato Brasileiro Série C: 2002
 Campeonato Brasiliense: 2008

References

1953 births
Living people
Footballers from Rio de Janeiro (city)
Brazilian footballers
Brazilian football managers
Campeonato Brasileiro Série A players
Campeonato Brasileiro Série B players
Campeonato Brasileiro Série B managers
Campeonato Brasileiro Série C managers
Fluminense FC players
Olaria Atlético Clube players
Club Athletico Paranaense players
América Futebol Clube (SP) players
São José Esporte Clube players
Clube Atlético Juventus players
Paulista Futebol Clube players
Paulista Futebol Clube managers
Associação Atlética Caldense managers
Brasiliense Futebol Clube managers
Clube Náutico Marcílio Dias managers
Goytacaz Futebol Clube managers
Brusque Futebol Clube managers
Clube Atlético Metropolitano managers
São Cristóvão de Futebol e Regatas managers
Friburguense Atlético Clube managers
Macaé Esporte Futebol Clube managers
Association football midfielders